René Poupardin (27 February 1874 – 23 August 1927) was a French medievalist and paleographer whose most important works were on Burgundy, Provence and the south Italian principalities. He was an alumnus of the École nationale des chartes and a member of the École française de Rome from 1899 to 1902. He was studies director at the École pratique des hautes études and later a professor at the École des chartes. He also worked as a librarian at the Bibliothèque nationale de France. Born at Le Havre and died at Fontainebleau, most of his life was spent in Paris and Rome.

Bibliography
Monographs
Boson et le royaume de Provence (855–933). Chalon-sur-Saône: E. Bertrand, 1899.
Le Royaume de Provence sous les Carolingiens, 855–933. Paris: Émile Bouillon, 1901. Online here
Le Royaume de Bourgogne, 888–1038: étude sur les origines du royaume d'Arles. Paris: Champion, 1907. Online here
Études sur l'histoire des principautés lombardes de l'Italie méridionale et de leurs rapports avec l'Empire franc. Paris: Champion, 1907. Online here

Critical editions
La Vie de Saint Didier: évêque de Cahors, 630–655. Paris: A. Picard, 1900. Online here
Monuments de l'histoire des abbayes de Saint-Philibert (Noirmoutier, Grandlieu, Tournus). Paris: A. Picard, 1905.
(with Louis Barrau-Dihigo) Cartulaire de Saint-Vincent-de-Lucq. Pau: J. Empérauger, 1905.
Recueil des chartes de l'abbaye de Saint-Germain-des-Prés: Des origines au début du XIIIe siècle, 2 vols. Paris: Champion, 1909–32.
(with Louis Halphen) Chroniques des comtes d'Anjou et des seigneurs d'Amboise. Paris: A. Picard, 1913.
Recueil des actes des rois de Provence: 855–928. Paris: Imprimerie nationale, 1920.

Bibliographies
Catalogue des manuscrits des collections Duchesne et Bréquigny. Paris: Éditions Ernest Leroux, 1905. Online here
(with Lucien Auvray) Catalogue des manuscrits de la Collection Baluze. Paris: Éditions Ernest Leroux, 1921. Online here

Sources

External links

1874 births
1927 deaths
20th-century French historians
École Nationale des Chartes alumni
French male non-fiction writers
French medievalists